Achilleas Grammatikopoulos (28 September 1908 – 30 December 2008) was a Greek association football player. He was considered one of the most prolific goalkeepers in the Greek league during the late 1920s and the early 1930s.

Grammatikopoulos was born in Piraeus in 1908. He started his football career at Aris Nikaia before transferring to Olympiakos whose nets he guarded from his debut on 4 November 1928 until 1944. He was considered one of the top keepers of the pre-WWII era and was capped 5 times by the Greece national team. His nickname during that time was "Zamora" after Ricardo Zamora, the top Spaniard goalkeeper of the same era.

Grammatikopoulos saw action in World War II. After his playing career was over, he stayed on in football as a referee. On 30 December 2008, he died in Piraeus of natural causes, at the age of 100.

References

1908 births
2008 deaths
Greek centenarians
Men centenarians
Greek footballers
Greece international footballers
Olympiacos F.C. players
Association football goalkeepers
Footballers from Piraeus